Sattari High School (Bengali:সাত্টারী উচ্চ বিদ্যালয়) is one a Government Aided School in Sattari village of Malda district. It was established in since 1971. The school is providing fundamental education procedure in the society. It spreads education in Sattari and nearby eight villages under the government body Binodpur Gram Panchayat.

Affiliations
The school is affiliated to West Bengal Board of Secondary Education for Madhyamik Education and West Bengal Council of Higher Secondary Education for Higher Secondary (+2) Education.

Uniform
Boys
White shirt/vest (with dark red collar)
Navy blue trousers
Navy blue sweater (in winter)

Girls
White shirt or blouse
Navy blue gown / navy blue-bordered white saree
Navy blue sweater (in winter)

Subjects

Sports
An annual sports day is held on the school campus. Many known sports are organised by WBGSTA (West Bengal Government School Teachers' Association) respectively. Sports include Football, Cricket, Table Tennis, and Kabaddi.

Gallery

External links

References

Schools in Malda district
Educational institutions established in 1970
1971 establishments in West Bengal